The Slovak Rugby Union is the governing body for rugby in Slovakia. The SRU is headed by the President Eduard Krützner with Michal Mihálik acting as the Chief Executive Officer.

History
In September 2015, SRU join the project of the World Rugby "Get into rugby", prior to becoming an associate member of World Rugby in May 2016.

Domestic rugby
The SRU oversees the national league system, known as the Slovak Rugby League Championship, and consisting of:
Rugby 7s league
Rugby XV league

It also oversees the test match outside of Slovakia, as in Austria, Hungary, and Czech Republic.

Links
Slovakia national rugby union team
FIRA-AER
Rugby Klub Bratislava
RC Slovan Bratislava
Rugby Union Club Piešťany
Ravens Košice Rugby Club

Notes
 The World Rugby Handbook lists Slovenská Rugbyová Únia as having gained associate member status in May 2016 although, as at January 2017, incorrectly records the country name as Slovenia instead of Slovakia. Slovenia's Rugby Zveza Slovenie is listed as being a World Rugby member since October 1996.

References

Sources

External links
SRU Official site

Rugby
Rugby union governing bodies in Europe
Rugby union in Slovakia
Organizations established in 2004